The red rock rat, or red veld rat, (Aethomys chrysophilus) is a species of rodent in the family Muridae native to southern Africa.

Description
The red rock rat is a rat-sized murine rodent. Males are not significantly larger than females. The fur on the upper body and flanks is mostly reddish-brown, but mixed with dark brown or black hairs, producing an overall colour that varies from orange-yellow or cinnamon to medium brown. The underparts are white or very pale grey, with a clear dividing line from the fur elsewhere on the body. The head is robust, with a heavy snout. Females have three pairs of teats.

Although red rock rats can be distinguished from most other species of the genus Aethomys by their size or bodily proportions, they appear essentially identical to Tete veld rats, and can only be reliably distinguished from them by genetic analysis or examination of the shape of their spermatozoa.

Distribution and habitat
Red rock rats are widely distributed across southern Africa, although the exact southern edge of their range is difficult to determine because of their extreme physical similarity to Tete veld rats, which are found in South Africa and Eswatini. Nonetheless, red rock rats are currently believed to live in east Africa from southern Kenya, through eastern Tanzania, Malawi, Mozambique, and Zimbabwe to the north-eastern border regions of South Africa. Further west, they are found through most of Zambia and Botswana to northern Namibia and south-western Angola.

Across this region, red rock rats inhabit savannah or woodland areas with dense vegetation or rocky cover below  elevation. They are often associated with miombo and mopane forest, but appear able to tolerate a wide range of habitats, so long as substantial ground cover is available.

Although at least seven subspecies of red rock rats have been identified, the validity of some of these is questionable, not least because of potential confusion with Tete veld rats in earlier works. Fossils indistinguishable from the modern species have been found which are dated as far back as 3.7 million years ago, in the late Pliocene of South Africa.

Biology and behaviour
Red rock rats are nocturnal and omnivorous, but feed mainly on plant matter, such as seeds, fruit, green leaves, and starchy roots. They shelter through the day in cup-like nests constructed in burrows, rock crevices, or termite mounds. In the wild, they appear territorial, reacting aggressively to intruders of their own species, but they are apparently able to tolerate each other after some time in captivity, establishing a stable dominance hierarchy.

In the wild, they breed during the rainy season, typically between October and January, although they are capable of breeding at any time of year in captivity. Gestation lasts 29 days, and results in the birth of between one and five, but typically three, young. The young are initially blind and helpless, with thin black fur over most of the body, and naked undersides. The teeth are already erupted at birth, and the eyes open after 10 to 14 days.

The young attain the full adult dimensions at around seven weeks, although they may still be somewhat lighter than fully grown adults at this point. They reach sexual maturity at around 82 days, but may not give birth to their first litter for up to six months.

References

Aethomys
Rodents of Africa
Mammals described in 1897
Taxa named by William Edward de Winton
Taxonomy articles created by Polbot